Tjenare kungen (international title: God Save the King - the title would more readily translate as a deliberately chummy "Yo, King!" or " 'Ullo the King!"") is a Swedish drama film which was released to cinemas in Sweden on 16 September 2005.

Plot
The film is set in 1982.

Cast
 Josefin Neldén as Abra
 Cecilia Wallin as Millan
 Joel Kinnaman as Dickan
 Malin Larsson as Isa
 Johanna Strömberg as Gloria
 Kjell Bergqvist as factory manager
 Fyr Thorwald as Bar-Jonny at Errols
 Morgan Alling as Stefan
 Erica Carlson as Abra's sister
 Jessica Persson as "Karin", Dickan's sister
 Ralph Carlsson as Leif
 Anders Lönnbro
 Daniel Gustavsson
 Markus Holmberg as Piffen

See also
 Ebba Grön

References

External links
 
 

Swedish comedy-drama films
Films set in the 1980s
2005 films
2000s Swedish-language films
Films whose director won the Best Director Guldbagge Award
Films directed by Ulf Malmros
2000s Swedish films